Haydn McAuliffe (born 15 May 1946) is  a former Australian rules footballer who played with South Melbourne in the Victorian Football League (VFL).

Notes

External links 

Living people
1946 births
Australian rules footballers from Victoria (Australia)
Sydney Swans players